The Roman Catholic Diocese of Cuautitlán is based in the city of Cuautitlán, State of Mexico, Mexico. It is a suffragan diocese of the Archdiocese of Tlalnepantla.

History
Pope John Paul II established the diocese on 5 February 1979.  On 9 June 2014, Pope Francis erected the new Diocese of Izcalli with territory taken from the diocese.

Ordinaries
Manuel Samaniego Barriga (1979 - 2005) 
Guillermo Ortiz Mondragón (2005 - 2021); died in office on September 14, 2021
Efraín Mendoza Cruz (2022 - present)

Gallery

References

External links

 
Cuautitlan
Cuautitlan
1979 establishments in Mexico